New Prospect for Hong Kong is a political group established in October 2019 consisting mainly of mainland Chinese living in Hong Kong, dubbed "gang piao" in Mandarin.

Background
The party was initially formed in October 2019 during the 2019-2020 Hong Kong protests. Its co-founder Gary Zhang was a manager at the Prince Edward station during the Prince Edward station attack on 31 August 2019 and had said that "Hongkongers are not rioters". The other co-founders included lawyer Paul Wang from Haldanes, and Marco Liu, founder of the PR company Hong Kong Asia Cultural Dissemination.

In the 2021 Legislative Council election, Gary Zhang ran in the New Territories North, receiving nominations from HKU professor Yuen Kwok-yung, former HKEx CEO Charles Li, Cheung Kong Holdings managing director Justin Chiu and MTR CEO Jacob Kam.

Elections performance

Legislative council elections

See also
 Bauhinia Party
 New immigrants in Hong Kong

References

External links
 New Prospect for Hong Kong Website

2019 establishments in Hong Kong
Political organisations based in Hong Kong
Political parties established in 2019
Conservative parties in Hong Kong